Raúl Aredes (born 14 December 1965) is a former Argentine footballer who played in clubs of Argentina, Chile, Mexico and Colombia.

Honours
 Atlético Tucumán
Torneo Interior (1): 1987

Universidad de Chile
 Primera División de Chile (1): 1994

References
 Profile at BDFA 

1965 births
Living people
Argentine footballers
Argentine expatriate footballers
Estudiantes de La Plata footballers
San Martín de San Juan footballers
Atlético Tucumán footballers
Unión de Santa Fe footballers
Deportivo Cali footballers
Deportes La Serena footballers
Universidad de Chile footballers
Argentine Primera División players
Primera Nacional players
Categoría Primera A players
Chilean Primera División players
Liga MX players
Expatriate footballers in Chile
Expatriate footballers in Mexico
Expatriate footballers in Colombia
Association football forwards
Atlético Tucumán managers